Danny van Dongen (born 1983) is a Dutch racing driver and entrepreneur currently competing in the MW-V6 Pickup Series.

Racing career

Van Dongen started his racing career in the Dutch Citroën Saxo Cup. He scored a third-place finish in the championship in 2000. The following year he graduated to the Renault Clio Cup finishing seventh. He also raced in the Dutch Formula Arcobaleno and the German Formula König. In 2002 he graduated into GT racing, racing a Marcos Mantis for semi-works team Eurotech. Van Dongen competed in the Dutch Supercar Challenge and the Euro GT Series. He also raced in the Spanish GT Championship for the Marcos works team in a Marcos LM600.

In 2006 the Dutch driver returned to his native country racing in the BRL V6 silhouette racing series. He achieved several podium finishes in 2006 and 2007. Van Dongen founded the Dutch Race Driver Academy a racing school for aspiring racing drivers. He also continued racing a Chevrolet Corvette C6 in the Dutch Supercar Challenge. The following year he raced the same car in the Dutch GT4 Championship. In 2009 and 2010 he scored a total of three wins in the championship driving a Corvette. The following year Van Dongen founded the Dutch Racing Driver Organisation. The organisation sanctions auto races in three different classes: BMW M3, Diesel and Specials. In 2011 he graduated from the Johan Cruijff Academy.  In the same year he was also a full-time racedriver in the ADAC GT Masters and Dutch Supercar Challenge. Van Dongen won two races, racing an Audi R8 LMS, in the Dutch Supercar Challenge GT class. In 2012 Danny van Dongen was contracted by Praga as a factory driver for the new Praga R1. He raced a limited schedule in the R1 predecessor the Praga R4S. At one of the few ovals in the Netherlands, Raceway Venray, he raced in the BRL V6 series scoring two wins and a second place in the championship. In 2013 he won the Dutch Supercar Challenge Superlights championship in the Praga R1 class. In 2014 Van Dongen returned to international racing in the Acceleration 2014 MW-V6 Pickup Series.

References

1983 births
Living people
Dutch racing drivers
ADAC GT Masters drivers
Formula Ford drivers
People from Zandvoort
Sportspeople from North Holland
24H Series drivers